Events of the year 1932 in Belgium.

Incumbents

Monarch
Albert I
Prime Minister
 Jules Renkin (to 22 October)
 Charles de Broqueville (from 22 October)

Events

 27 June to 10 September – Ten weeks of strikes in the Borinage to protest against economic conditions.
 9 October – Municipal elections
 18 October – Jules Renkin offers his resignation as prime minister
 27 November – Legislative election returns Catholic Party majority
 4 December – Provincial elections

Publications
 Franz Hellens, Poésie de la veille et du lendemain
 Hergé, Tintin en Amérique (serialised 1931–1932) published as an album

Art and architecture
Paintings
 René Magritte, The Universe Unmasked

Cinema
 La Nuit du Carrefour (France), Jean Renoir's adaptation of Georges Simenon's La Nuit du carrefour (1931)

Business
 Lotus Bakeries established

Births
 17 January – Roger Lallemand, politician (died 2016)
 11 March – Piet Van Brabant, journalist (died 2006)
 18 March – Arthur Luysterman, bishop of Ghent
 23 March – Bettina Le Beau, actress (died 2015)
 31 March – Jean-Pierre Grafé, politician (died 2019)
 29 June – Evrard Godefroid, cyclist (died 2013)
 4 July – Aurèle Vandendriessche, marathon runner
 20 August – Claudine Wallet, Olympic fencer
 4 October – Étienne Davignon, politician
 6 November – François Englert, theoretical physicist
 23 November – Solange Berry, singer
 16 December – Karel Oomen, wrestler
 20 December – Carla Walschap, writer and teacher

Deaths
 17 February – Fredegand Cogels (born 1850), politician
 10 April – Jean-François Heymans (born 1859), pharmacologist 
 19 April – Edgard Colle (born 1897), chess master
 24 June – Guy Reyntiens (born 1880), Olympic equestrian
 25 July – Cyriel Buysse (born 1859), playwright
 20 August – Émile Mathieu (born 1844), composer
 27 August – Ursmer Berlière (born 1861), monastic historian
 29 September – Émile van Ermengem (born 1851), bacteriologist 
 7 October – Eugène Broerman (born 1861), painter
 28 October – Joseph Dejardin (born 1873), trade unionist

References

 
1930s in Belgium